Hugh Anthony Quarshie (born 22 December 1954) is a Ghanaian-born British actor. Some of his best-known roles include his appearances in the films Highlander (1986), The Church (1989), Star Wars: Episode I – The Phantom Menace (1999), and the Doctor Who episodes "Daleks in Manhattan" and "Evolution of the Daleks" (2007) as well as his long-running role as Ric Griffin in the BBC One medical drama Holby City (2001–2020). Quarshie played the role of Ric for 19 years and was the longest-serving cast member in Holby City, until he confirmed his departure in October 2020. The character departed in Episode 1034 (Episode 26) of Series 22, which aired on 10 November 2020, though he returned for the show's final episode in March 2022.

Early life
A member of the Euro-African community of Ghana, Quarshie is of mixed Ghanaian, English and Dutch ancestry. He was born in Accra, Ghana, to Emma Wilhelmina (née Phillips; 1917–2004) and Richard Quarshie (1913–2006). His mother was of chiefly ancestry; her relatives currently serve as the chiefs of the Ghanaian village of Abii. 

Hugh emigrated with his family to the United Kingdom at the age of three. He was educated at Bryanston School in Dorset and Dean Close School in Cheltenham, Gloucestershire (during which time he played the role of Othello at the Tuckwell Theatre), before reading PPE at Christ Church, Oxford.

Acting career
Quarshie had considered becoming a journalist before taking up acting. He is a member of the Royal Shakespeare Company, and has appeared in many stage productions and television programmes, including the serial Behaving Badly with Judi Dench. He is well known for playing the roles of Sunda Kastagir in Highlander, Captain Panaka in Star Wars: Episode I – The Phantom Menace, and Ric Griffin on the television series Holby City. He attended the Star Wars fan event "Star Wars Celebration" in 1999. He portrayed Lieutenant Obutu in Wing Commander.

He appeared in the 2007 two-part Doctor Who episode "Daleks in Manhattan"/"Evolution of the Daleks" as Solomon, the leader of the shanty town Hooverville. He headed the cast of Michele Soavi's The Church (1989) as Father Gus, and played Aaron the Moor in the BBC Television Shakespeare's Titus Andronicus.

Quarshie has also narrated for television. His work includes the 2006 documentary Mega Falls of Iguacu (about the Iguaçu Falls), the 2009 adaptation of Small Island, and the 2010 BBC Wildlife series The Great Rift: Africa's Wild Heart.

Personal life
In September 2010, Quarshie featured in an episode of Who Do You Think You Are?, in which he traced his Ghanaian and Dutch origins. The episode revealed that Quarshie was part of his country's old mixed race elite as one of his ancestors, Pieter Martinus Johannes Kamerling, was a Dutch official on the Gold Coast. This also made him a distant relative of Dutch actor Antonie Kamerling.

Politics
Quarshie is a supporter of the Women's Equality Party.

Filmography

Film

Television

Theatre
 Cymbeline as Posthumus (Royal Exchange, Manchester) (1984)
 The Admirable Crichton as Crichton (Royal Exchange, Manchester) (1985)
 Goethe's Faust as Mephistopheles (RSC, 1995)
 Julius Caesar as Mark Antony (RSC, 1995)
 Othello as Othello (RSC, 2015)

References

External links

Hugh Quarshie  StarWars.com

1954 births
Living people
20th-century English male actors
21st-century English male actors
Alumni of Christ Church, Oxford
Black British male actors
English male film actors
English male stage actors
English male television actors
English male voice actors
English people of Dutch descent
Ghanaian people of Dutch descent
Ghanaian people of English descent
Ghanaian emigrants to England
People educated at Bryanston School
People educated at Dean Close School
People from Accra
Royal Shakespeare Company members
Women's Equality Party people
British male stage actors
English male Shakespearean actors